Eric Kebbon (June 6, 1890–April 18, 1964) was an American architect.

Eric Kebbon's full name was Harold Eric Kebbon. He was born in Brooklyn, N.Y. on June 6, 1890 to Gustave Adolph Kebbon, born in Sweden, and Datie Louise Eldridge. He died in the Bronx, N.Y. on April 18, 1964 at the age of 73. He was a 1912 graduate from M.I.T. with a Bachelor of Science in Architecture Degree and of which he was the senior class president as well as Editor-In-Chief of the Technique - M.I.T.'s 1912 yearbook. He graduated from Somerville English High School in Boston, Mass., in 1908 and of which he was also the senior class president. After graduation, he travelled in Europe and upon return, he became M.I.T's architect for buildings up to $6,000,000. With the approach of WW1 he enlisted into the Army and was promoted to Major in the U.S. Army Corps of Engineers from 1917-1919 during WW1. After WW1, he married Jane Holmes Jutte (1895-1992) and they had two children. He also went into private practice designing private residences and housing developments. During the 1930's under the New Deal, he was hired by the U.S. Treasury to design several Court Houses and U. S. Post Offices. He worked as a consulting architect for the Office of the Supervising Architect and is credited as the design architect of at least six post office buildings. In 1938, he was appointed by the N.Y.C. Mayor, F. La Guardia, to be the supervising architect for the N.Y.C Department of Education Design and Construction Dept., through which he designed and constructed more than 100 schools. He retired from the position on Jan. 1, 1952 but maintained a continued working relationship with the Ed. Dept.. He later went back into private practice and then for a short time, from 1956-1958, he worked with the noted firm of McKim, Mead, & White, after which he retired from practice.  

A number of his works are listed on the U.S. National Register of Historic Places.

He served as architect of the New York City Board of Education from 1938 - 1952. In 1952 he was elected into the National Academy of Design as an Associate Academician. He was elected as a Fellow of the American Institute of Architects and held several positions during the 1930's, Secretary and Vice President, within the New York, AIA Chapter.  Eric was buried in Stonington Cemetery, Stonington, Conn. and his simple modern form pedimented white marble gravestone with an ionic capital carved into the surface reads - "ARCHITECT" below which is carved "BEAUTY" "INTEGRITY" "HUMANITY".

Works include:
US Post Office-Bronxville, built 1937, Pondfield Rd., Bronxville, NY (Kebbon, Eric), NRHP-listed
US Post Office-Far Rockaway, built 1935, 18-36 Mott Ave., New York, NY (Kebbon, Eric), NRHP-listed
US Post Office-Lenox Hill Station, built 1935, 221 E. 70th St., New York, NY (Kebbon, Eric), NRHP-listed
US Post Office-Old Chelsea Station, built 1935, 217 W. 18th St., New York, NY (Kebbon, Eric), NRHP-listed
US Post Office-Poughkeepsie, built 1939, Mansion St., Poughkeepsie, NY (Kebbon, Eric), NRHP-listed
U.S. Post Office - Planetarium Station, built 1937, New York, NY
a federal building, Greenville, South Carolina
United States Courthouse (Tallahassee, Florida, 1936), Tallahassee, Florida
Joan of Arc Junior High School, built 1941, W. 93rd St., New York, NY
Queens Valley School (PS 164), built 1948, 138-01 77 Avenue, Queens, New York
East New York Vocational High School, built 1941, 1 Wells Street, Brooklyn, New York 
High School for Home-Making (now Clara Barton), built 1938–41, 901 Classon Ave [Brooklyn]
Midwood High School, built 1939 - 1940, 2839 Bedford Ave, Brooklyn, New York
Fort Hamilton High School, built 1940-1941, 8301 Shore Road, Brooklyn, New York

References

1890s births
1964 deaths
20th-century American architects
Massachusetts Institute of Technology alumni
National Academy of Design associates